Abdul Aziz bin Ali al-Harbi is a Saudi Arabian Islamic scholar and associate professor at Umm al-Qura University in Mecca. He is one of the founders and the current president of the Arabic Language Academy in Mecca.

Career
A native of Mecca, Harbi memorized the entirety of the Qur'an by the age of eleven.

Harbi earned a Bachelor of Arts degree in Exegesis of the Qur'an, known to Muslims as Tafsir, from Islamic University of Madinah in 1989. Nine years later, he completed a Master of Arts degree in the Muslim prophetic tradition, known as the Sunnah, at Umm al-Qura University, where he would eventually complete his Doctorate of Philosophy in Qur'anic exegesis in 2001. He was promoted to the rank of associate professor at Umm al-Qura in 2006, and currently teaches exegesis. He is also a member of the university's academic board.

Harbi also has an Ijazah authorization in all ten Qira'at, or variant methods of reciting the Qur'an, with a complete chain of narration going back to the original reciters of the Qur'an. The majority of his published works, however, have been within the field of the Arabic language, especially in regard to Arabic rhetoric.

Citations

1965 births
Living people
People from Mecca
Jurisprudence academics
Literary critics of Arabic
21st-century Muslim scholars of Islam
Quranic exegesis scholars
20th-century Saudi Arabian poets
Saudi Arabian Sunni Muslim scholars of Islam
Sunni fiqh scholars
Sunni Muslim scholars of Islam
Zahiris
Umm al-Qura University alumni
Academic staff of Umm al-Qura University
Islamic University of Madinah alumni
21st-century Saudi Arabian poets